Andrey Leonidovich Martynov (born 24 October 1945) is a Soviet and Russian film and theater actor.

Honors and awards
Martynov has received the People's Artist of Russia (1994) award. Previously, he has received the USSR State Prize (1975), the Vasilyev brothers State Prize of the RSFSR (1982), and the Lenin Komsomol Award (1974).

Biography

Career
Andrey Martynov was born in Ivanovo, Russian SFSR, Soviet Union. In 1970 he graduated from the Russian Academy of Theatre Arts (GITIS). From 1970 he worked as an actor of the Moscow Youth Theatre, and in 1972 he became an actor of the Moscow Drama Theater on Malaya Bronnaya.

His debut in film was in the Stanislav Rostotsky movie The Dawns Here Are Quiet, which brought him nationwide acclaim. Since 1981, he has acted for the Gorky Film Studio.

Personal life
He was married to a German, Franziska Thun. He has a son, Alexander, and three grandchildren, who live in Germany.

Filmography
 1972 The Dawns Here Are Quiet as sergeant Fedot Vaskov
 1973 Eternal Call as Kiryan Inyutin
 1977 White Bim Black Ear as senior lieutenant, Andrey Leonidovich
 1978 Captain's Daughter as Maksimych
 1981 The last day facts as Kryakvin
 1982 Vasily Buslaev as Akulov
 1982 Crazy Day of Engineer Barkasov aa Slonyaev, poet
 1985 Battle of Moscow as muscovites  militia  commander
 1986 One Second for a Feat as 
 1990 Nikolai Vavilov as Sergei Vavilov
 1991 Tsar Ivan the Terrible as Malyuta Skuratov
 1997 Magic Portrait as Tit
 1997 Tsarevich Aleksey as Afanasich
 1998 Mu-Mu as Gavrila Andreevich
 1999 The President and His Granddaughter as episode
 2003 Do not Get Used to Miracles as episode
 2003 Black Mark aa politburo member Yakovlev
 2004 Wealth as Pavel Blinov

References

External links
 
 Андрей Мартынов at the KinoPoisk

1945 births
Living people
People from Ivanovo
Soviet male film actors
Soviet male stage actors
Soviet male television actors
Russian male film actors
Russian male stage actors
Russian male voice actors
Russian male television actors
Honored Artists of the RSFSR
Recipients of the USSR State Prize
Recipients of the Lenin Komsomol Prize
Recipients of the Vasilyev Brothers State Prize of the RSFSR
Communist Party of the Soviet Union members
Russian Academy of Theatre Arts alumni
People's Artists of Russia